Swan Village railway station was a station on the Great Western Railway's London Paddington to Birkenhead via Birmingham Snow Hill line. It was opened in 1854. It was the junction station where the Dudley Branch of the line diverged from the main line. Its location is distinguished by the angled supports for the road bridge at the former station site.

The station was rebuilt between 1959 and 1961 to the designs of the British Rail Western Region architect Ray Moorcroft.

The Dudley branch closed in 1964 as part of the Beeching Axe, but Swan Village remained open until 1972 and the closure of the main line. A level crossing was situated at one end of the station, and Black Lake tram stop on the Midland Metro route is situated on the other side of this crossing.

References

Disused railway stations in Sandwell
Railway stations in Great Britain opened in 1854
Railway stations in Great Britain closed in 1972
Former Great Western Railway stations